Philip Castle (born 1942 in Yorkshire, England), is a British airbrush artist.

Castle is best known for designing posters for the Stanley Kubrick films A Clockwork Orange and Full Metal Jacket as well for Paul McCartney's Wings tour, among others. He was also responsible for the artwork of the hard rock video magazine, Hard'n'Heavy, the cover art for the seminal computer game Elite and its accompanying novella, as well as the European poster for the Tim Burton film Mars Attacks!. He has also designed record sleeves for albums by David Bowie, Mott the Hoople, The Cars, Elkie Brooks, and Pulp.
 
More recently he was commissioned to create the artwork for Metronomy's 2008 album Nights Out as well as their single "Heartbreaker".

Philip also designed the posters for the Royal International Air Tattoo, held at RAF Fairford in Gloucestershire, United Kingdom, for the 2008, 2009 and 2010 events.

Philip is also known for paintings combining women, often Hollywood idols, into the composition of paintings with classic aircraft, notably Plane Jane, a portrait of Jane Russell with a B-17 bomber.

References

20th-century English painters
English male painters
21st-century English painters
Film poster artists
Living people
1943 births
Album-cover and concert-poster artists
20th-century English male artists
21st-century English male artists